Dai Aoki (born 24 October 1994) is a Japanese judoka.

He is the gold medallist of the 2016 Judo Grand Prix Budapest in the -60 kg category.

References

External links
 

1994 births
Living people
Japanese male judoka